Daniel Neumann (born April 26, 1989) is a Slovak professional ice hockey player. He has played for HC Slovan Bratislava in the Slovak Extraliga.

References

External links

Living people
HC Slovan Bratislava players
1989 births
Slovak ice hockey defencemen
Ice hockey people from Bratislava
Expatriate ice hockey players in Slovenia
Slovak expatriate sportspeople in Slovenia
Slovak expatriate ice hockey people